In probability theory, there exist several different notions of convergence of random variables.  The convergence of sequences of random variables to some limit random variable is an important concept in probability theory, and its applications to statistics and stochastic processes. The same concepts are known in more general mathematics as stochastic convergence and they formalize the idea that a sequence of essentially random or unpredictable events can sometimes be expected to settle down into a behavior that is essentially unchanging when items far enough into the sequence are studied. The different possible notions of convergence relate to how such a behavior can be characterized: two readily understood behaviors are that the sequence eventually takes a constant value, and that values in the sequence continue to change but can be described by an unchanging probability distribution.

Background
"Stochastic convergence" formalizes the idea that a sequence of essentially random or unpredictable events can sometimes be expected to settle into a pattern. The pattern may for instance be
Convergence in the classical sense to a fixed value,  perhaps itself coming from a random event
An increasing similarity of outcomes to what a purely deterministic function would produce
An increasing preference towards a certain outcome
An increasing "aversion" against straying far away from a certain outcome
That the probability distribution describing the next outcome may grow increasingly similar to a certain distribution

Some less obvious, more theoretical patterns could be
That the series formed by calculating the expected value of the outcome's distance from a particular value may converge to 0
That the variance of the random variable describing the next event grows smaller and smaller.
These other types of patterns that may arise are reflected in the different types of stochastic convergence that have been studied.

While the above discussion has related to the convergence of a single series to a limiting value, the notion of the convergence of two series towards each other is also important, but this is easily handled by studying the sequence defined as either the difference or the ratio of the two series.

For example, if the average of n independent random variables Yi, i = 1, ..., n, all having the same finite mean and variance, is given by

then as n tends to infinity,  converges in probability (see below) to the common mean, μ, of the random variables Yi.  This result is known as the weak law of large numbers.  Other forms of convergence are important in other useful theorems, including the central limit theorem.

Throughout the following, we assume that (Xn) is a sequence of random variables, and X is a random variable, and all of them are defined on the same probability space  .

Convergence in distribution 

With this mode of convergence,  we increasingly expect to see the next outcome in a sequence of random experiments becoming better and better modeled by a given probability distribution.

Convergence in distribution is the weakest form of convergence typically discussed, since it is implied by all other types of convergence mentioned in this article. However, convergence in distribution is very frequently used in practice; most often it arises from application of the central limit theorem.

Definition
A sequence  of real-valued random variables, with cumulative distribution functions , is said to converge in distribution, or converge weakly, or converge in law to a random variable  with cumulative distribution function  if

 

The requirement that only the continuity points of  should be considered is essential. For example, if  are distributed uniformly on intervals , then this sequence converges in distribution to the degenerate random variable . However, for this limiting random variable , even though  for all . Thus the convergence of cdfs fails at the point  where  is discontinuous.

Convergence in distribution may be denoted as

For example, if  is standard normal we can write .

For random vectors  the convergence in distribution is defined similarly. We say that this sequence converges in distribution to a random -vector  if
 

The definition of convergence in distribution may be extended from random vectors to more general random elements in arbitrary metric spaces, and even to the “random variables” which are not measurable — a situation which occurs for example in the study of empirical processes. This is the “weak convergence of laws without laws being defined” — except asymptotically.

 
for all continuous bounded functions . Here E* denotes the outer expectation, that is the expectation of a “smallest measurable function  that dominates ”.

Properties
In general, convergence in distribution does not imply that the sequence of corresponding probability density functions will also converge. As an example one may consider random variables with densities . These random variables converge in distribution to a uniform U(0, 1), whereas their densities do not converge at all.
 However, according to Scheffé’s theorem, convergence of the probability density functions implies convergence in distribution.
 The portmanteau lemma provides several equivalent definitions of convergence in distribution. Although these definitions are less intuitive, they are used to prove a number of statistical theorems. The lemma states that  converges in distribution to  if and only if any of the following statements are true:
  for all bounded, continuous functions  (where  denotes the expected value operator);
  for all bounded, Lipschitz functions ;
  for all nonnegative, continuous functions ;
  for every open set ;
  for every closed set ;
  for all continuity sets  of random variable ;
  for every upper semi-continuous function  bounded above;
  for every lower semi-continuous function  bounded below.
  Convergence in distribution is metrizable by the Lévy–Prokhorov metric.
  A natural link to convergence in distribution is the Skorokhod's representation theorem.

Convergence in probability 

The basic idea behind this type of convergence is that the probability of an “unusual” outcome becomes smaller and smaller as the sequence progresses.

The concept of convergence in probability is used very often in statistics. For example, an estimator is called consistent if it converges in probability to the quantity being estimated. Convergence in probability is also the type of convergence established by the weak law of large numbers.

Definition 
A sequence {Xn} of random variables converges in probability towards the random variable X if for all ε > 0

 

More explicitly, let Pn(ε) be the probability that Xn is outside the ball of radius ε centered at X. Then  is said to converge in probability to X if for any  and any δ > 0 there exists a number N (which may depend on ε and δ) such that for all n ≥ N, Pn(ε) < δ (the definition of limit).

Notice that for the condition to be satisfied, it is not possible that for each n the random variables X and Xn are independent (and thus convergence in probability is a condition on the joint cdf's, as opposed to convergence in distribution, which is a condition on the individual cdf's), unless X is deterministic like for the weak law of large numbers. At the same time, the case of a deterministic X cannot, whenever the deterministic value is a discontinuity point (not isolated), be handled by convergence in distribution, where discontinuity points have to be explicitly excluded.

Convergence in probability is denoted by adding the letter p over an arrow indicating convergence, or using the "plim" probability limit operator:

For random elements {Xn} on a separable metric space , convergence in probability is defined similarly by

Properties
 Convergence in probability implies convergence in distribution.[proof]
 In the opposite direction, convergence in distribution implies convergence in probability when the limiting random variable X is a constant.[proof]
 Convergence in probability does not imply almost sure convergence.[proof]
 The continuous mapping theorem states that for every continuous function , if , then also 
 Convergence in probability defines a topology on the space of random variables over a fixed probability space. This topology is metrizable by the Ky Fan metric:  or alternately by this metric

Almost sure convergence 

This is the type of stochastic convergence that is most similar to pointwise convergence known from elementary real analysis.

Definition
To say that the sequence  converges almost surely or almost everywhere or with probability 1 or strongly towards X means that

This means that the values of  approach the value of X, in the sense (see almost surely) that events for which  does not converge to X have probability 0.  Using the probability space  and the concept of the random variable as a function from Ω to R, this is equivalent to the statement

Using the notion of the limit superior of a sequence of sets, almost sure convergence can also be defined as follows:

Almost sure convergence is often denoted by adding the letters a.s. over an arrow indicating convergence:

For generic random elements {Xn} on a metric space , convergence almost surely is defined similarly:

Properties
 Almost sure convergence implies convergence in probability (by Fatou's lemma), and hence implies convergence in distribution.  It is the notion of convergence used in the strong law of large numbers.
 The concept of almost sure convergence does not come from a topology on the space of random variables. This means there is no topology on the space of random variables such that the almost surely convergent sequences are exactly the converging sequences with respect to that topology. In particular, there is no metric of almost sure convergence.

Sure convergence or pointwise convergence
To say that the sequence of random variables (Xn) defined over the same probability space (i.e., a random process) converges surely or everywhere or pointwise  towards X means

where Ω is the sample space of the underlying probability space over which the random variables are defined.

This is the notion of pointwise convergence of a sequence of functions extended to a sequence of random variables. (Note that random variables themselves are functions).

Sure convergence of a random variable implies all the other kinds of convergence stated above, but there is no payoff in probability theory by using sure convergence compared to using almost sure convergence. The difference between the two only exists on sets with probability zero. This is why the concept of sure convergence of random variables is very rarely used.

Convergence in mean 
 
where the operator E denotes the expected value.

This type of convergence is often denoted by adding the letter Lr over an arrow indicating convergence:

The most important cases of convergence in r-th mean are:
 When  converges in r-th mean to X for r = 1, we say that  converges in  mean to X.
 When  converges in r-th mean to X for r = 2, we say that  converges in  mean square (or in quadratic mean) to X.

Convergence in the r-th mean, for r ≥ 1, implies convergence in probability (by Markov's inequality). Furthermore, if r > s ≥ 1, convergence in r-th mean implies convergence in s-th mean.  Hence, convergence in mean square implies convergence in mean.

It is also worth noticing that if 

then

Properties
Provided the probability space is complete:
 None of the above statements are true for convergence in distribution.
 
The chain of implications between the various notions of convergence are noted in their respective sections. They are, using the arrow notation:

 

These properties, together with a number of other special cases, are summarized in the following list:

  Almost sure convergence implies convergence in probability:[proof]

 Convergence in probability implies there exists a sub-sequence  which almost surely converges: 
 
 Convergence in probability implies convergence in distribution:[proof]
 
   Convergence in r-th order mean implies convergence in probability:
 
   Convergence in r-th order mean implies convergence in lower order mean, assuming that both orders are greater than or equal to one:
  provided r ≥ s ≥ 1.
   If Xn converges in distribution to a constant c, then Xn converges in probability to c:[proof]
  provided c is a constant.
   If  converges in distribution to X and the difference between Xn and Yn converges in probability to zero, then Yn also converges in distribution to X:[proof]
 
   If  converges in distribution to X and Yn converges in distribution to a constant c, then the joint vector  converges in distribution to :[proof]
  provided c is a constant.
   If Xn converges in probability to X and Yn converges in probability to Y, then the joint vector  converges in probability to :[proof]
 
 If  converges in probability to X, and if  for all n and some b, then  converges in rth mean to X for all . In other words, if  converges in probability to X and all random variables  are almost surely bounded above and below, then  converges to X also in any rth mean.
 Almost sure representation. Usually, convergence in distribution does not imply convergence almost surely.
 If for all ε > 0,

then we say that  converges almost completely, or almost in probability towards X. When  converges almost completely towards X then it also converges almost surely to X.  In other words, if  converges in probability to X sufficiently quickly (i.e. the above sequence of tail probabilities is summable for all ), then  also converges almost surely to X. This is a direct implication from the Borel–Cantelli lemma.
 If  is a sum of n real independent random variables:

then  converges almost surely if and only if  converges in probability.
 The dominated convergence theorem gives sufficient conditions for almost sure convergence to imply L1-convergence:

If  are discrete and independent, then  implies that . This is a consequence of the second Borel–Cantelli lemma.

See also

 Proofs of convergence of random variables
 Convergence of measures
 Convergence in measure
 Continuous stochastic process: the question of continuity of a stochastic process is essentially a question of convergence, and many of the same concepts and relationships used above apply to the continuity question.
 Asymptotic distribution
 Big O in probability notation
 Skorokhod's representation theorem
 The Tweedie convergence theorem
 Slutsky's theorem
 Continuous mapping theorem

Notes

References 

 
 
 
 
 
 
 
 
 
 
 
 
 
 

 https://www.ma.utexas.edu/users/gordanz/notes/weak.pdf

Stochastic processes
Random variables, Convergence of